Stenhouse Bay is a place in the Australian state of South Australia near the south-west extremity of the Yorke Peninsula located in the gazetted locality of Inneston about  west of the state capital of Adelaide.

Naming
Stenhouse Bay was named after Andrew Stenhouse who was a principal of the Permasite Manufacturing Co Pty Ltd which held “leases for the harvesting of gypsum north of Cape Spencer.”

Since 1999, it has been located within the locality of Inneston.
Its official status as of 2013 is that of a ‘locality unbounded’ which is listed on the South Australian place name gazetteer with the advice that it is “not to be used as an address.”

History

Gypsum works
The Waratah Gypsum Company had works here for the quarrying and exporting of rock gypsum. Gypsum after being washed, roasted and ground, was used in the manufacturing of plaster of paris and cement. The quality of the gypsum in this area was exceptionally high class and most of Australia's needs were supplied from here.

The Waratah Gypsum Company closed its works and the town was sold to the South Australian Government which demolished the town except for the few houses required for the rangers of the National Parks and Wildlife Organization who look after Innes National Park.

National park

Weather station
Stenhouse Bay has been the site of an automatic weather station since 20 November 1995.

Climate

Innes Park Trading Post and Rhino's Tavern

After almost 60 years, the shop at Stenhouse Bay, trading in recent years as Innes Park Trading Post and Rhino's Tavern, was demolished before Christmas in 2013. 

The iconic trading post and tavern was closed and fenced off just before the peak Christmas period. Park visitors must now travel 5km out of the park back to Marion Bay for fuel, camping goods and a restaurant meal. The closure meant the department lost between $30,000 and $50,000 in annual lease revenue.

See also
Hougomont (barque)

References

Coastal towns in South Australia
Investigator Strait